Old Sock is the nineteenth solo studio album by  Eric Clapton. It includes the two new compositions "Gotta Get Over" and "Every Little Thing", as well as covers. Several notable musicians were involved in the album, including Steve Winwood, JJ Cale and Paul McCartney.

Background
Old Sock includes two new compositions ("Gotta Get Over" and "Every Little Thing"), and covers of some of his favourite songs from childhood to the current day. Several notable musicians were involved in the album, including Steve Winwood, JJ Cale and Paul McCartney. This is Cale's final major recorded contribution before his death in July 2013. It reached No. 11 in the UK Album Chart and No. 7 in the U.S.

Clapton previously considered naming the album 50 Years of Drift in an Open Tuning, a homage to the Derek Taylor book 50 Years Adrift (In An Open Necked Shirt). He was inspired to name the album Old Sock from a conversation with David Bowie. After hearing Bowie's then-new song "Where Are We Now?", Clapton sent a note thanking him "for writing such a beautiful song". Bowie responded, "Thanks for the shoutout, old sock. Really appreciate it." Bowie allowed Clapton to use the phrase for his album title and share the story of their conversation. Following Bowie's death in 2016, Clapton wrote "Sweet dreams old sock" on his Facebook account.

The album cover is a selfie Clapton took with his iPhone while on holiday in Antigua.

Track listing
"Further on Down the Road" (featuring Taj Mahal) (Taj Mahal, Jesse E. Davis) – 5:42
"Angel" (featuring J.J. Cale) (Cale) – 3:53
"The Folks Who Live on the Hill" (Oscar Hammerstein II, Jerome Kern) – 3:44
"Gotta Get Over" (featuring Chaka Khan) (Doyle Bramhall II, Justin Stanley, Nikka Costa) – 4:36
"Till Your Well Runs Dry" (Peter Tosh) – 4:40
"All of Me" (featuring Paul McCartney) (Gerald Marks, Seymour Simons) – 3:22
"Born to Lose" (Ted Daffan) – 4:01
"Still Got the Blues" (featuring Steve Winwood) (Gary Moore) – 5:52
"Goodnight Irene" (Huddie Ledbetter, John A. Lomax, Sr.) – 4:20
"Your One and Only Man" (Otis Redding) – 4:27
"Every Little Thing" (Doyle Bramhall II, Justin Stanley, Nikka Costa) – 4:31
"Our Love Is Here to Stay" (George Gershwin, Ira Gershwin) – 4:11
"No Sympathy" (Bonus Track) (Tosh) – 4:08

Personnel 

 Eric Clapton – lead vocals, electric guitar, acoustic guitar, 12-string guitar, dobro, mandolin
 Doyle Bramhall II – electric guitar, acoustic guitar, slide guitar, mandolin, backing vocals
 Greg Leisz – pedal steel guitar, mandolin
 Taj Mahal –  banjo and harmonica on "Further on Down the Road"
 J. J. Cale – guitar and vocals on "Angel"
 Tim Carmon – Hammond B3 organ
 Simon Climie – acoustic piano, percussion
 Frank Marocco – accordion
 Walt Richmond – upright piano, keyboards
 Matt Rollings – keyboards
 Chris Stainton – clavinet, Fender Rhodes, acoustic piano, Hammond B3 organ
 Justin Stanley – clavinet, Mellotron, drums
 Steve Winwood – Hammond B3 organ on "Still Got the Blues"
 Willie Weeks – bass guitar, upright bass
 Paul McCartney – upright bass and backing vocals on "All of Me"
 Matt Chamberlain – drums 
 Steve Gadd – drums
 Jim Keltner – drums
 Abe Laboriel Jr. – drums
 Henry Spinetti – drums
 Gabe Witcher – fiddle
 Stephen "Doc" Kupka – baritone saxophone
 Joseph Sublett – tenor saxophone
 Nicholas Lane – trombone
 Sal Cracchiolo – trumpet
 Nick Ingman – string arrangements and conductor
 Isobel Griffiths – strings contractor
 Perry Montague-Mason – strings leader
 Thomas Bowes – strings leader
 Sharon White – backing vocals
 Michelle John – backing vocals
 Chaka Khan – guest vocals on "Gotta Get Over"
 Julie Clapton – guest vocals
 Ella Clapton – guest vocals
 Sophie Clapton – guest vocals
 Nikka Costa – guest vocals
 Wendy Moten – guest vocals
 Lisa Vaughan – guest vocals

Production 
 Producers – Doyle Bramhall II, Eric Clapton, Simon Climie and Justin Stanley.
 Recorded by Simon Climie, Alan Douglas, Steve Price and Justin Stanley.
 Assistant Engineers – Nick Cervonaro, Martin Cooke, Fiona Cruickshank, Joel Evenden, Alex Graupera, Joe Kearns, Paul LaMalfa, Kevin Mills, Harry Rutherford and Kyle Stevens.
 Mixed by Simon Climie
 Recorded at Air Lyndhurst Hall and Angel Recording Studios (London, England).
 Mastered by Bob Ludwig at Gateway Mastering (Portland, ME).
 Production Coordinator and Musician Contactors – Debbie Johnson and Shari Sutcliffe.
 Cover and Photography by Eric Clapton
 Design – Catherine Roylance, Noiseland Industries.

Charts and certifications

Weekly charts

Year-end charts

Certifications

References
All information from CD booklet (Bushbranch catalogue #2-18015)

Eric Clapton albums
2013 albums
Surfdog Records albums
Albums produced by Simon Climie